The Burrow  is an organisation linked to South Sydney Rabbitohs Rugby League Football Club, based in Redfern, a suburb of inner-southern Sydney, New South Wales.

The South Sydney Rabbitohs continue to have a large supporter base in their traditional areas of South-eastern Sydney, despite having moved from Redfern Oval two decades ago. They also enjoy wide support throughout other rugby league playing centres around the country. The official South Sydney supporter group is known as "The Burrow." While their active supporter group is known as "Gate38" which is made up of young men who were involved in the "scumgate" scandal in 2013. The Rabbitohs also have a large supporter base in Perth, where they rival the Fremantle Dockers in supporter size.

The Rabbitohs have the highest football club membership in the National Rugby League, with total membership exceeding 35,000 as of 23 June 2015. The total member number also includes more than 11,000 ticketed members to date, the highest of the Sydney-based NRL Clubs. It was announced during the 2010 Charity Shield game that both St George Illawarra and Souths had exceeded the 10,000 milestone, making the 2010 season the first time two Sydney clubs have entered the season with 10,000 ticketed members each. The club has members from every state in Australia and international members located in 22 countries. Football club membership had peaked at some 22,000 when the club was readmitted to the National Rugby League for season 2002.

"Group 14", a collection of the club's backers which comprise an influential collection of businessmen, politicians and media personalities, was formed before the Rabbitohs' exclusion from the NRL in 1999. Members included Andrew Denton, Anthony Albanese, Deirdre Grusovin, Mike Whitney, Laurie Brereton, Mikey Robins, Ron Hoenig, Nick Greiner, Ray Martin, Cathy Freeman, Candice Warner and former NSW Premier Kristina Keneally. They contributed to South Sydney's bid for reinstatement, following the club's exclusion from the competition at the end of the 1999 season. A sustained campaign of public support that year, unprecedented in Australian sporting history, saw 40,000 people attending a rally in the Sydney CBD in support of South Sydney's cause. In 2000 and 2001, public street marches took place in Sydney with in excess of 80,000 people rallying behind the Rabbitohs. The club also has a number of high-profile supporters as well, many of whom were dominant figures in their battle to be readmitted into the premiership in 2000 and 2001. In 2007 supporters set a new club record for attendance with an average home crowd figure of 15,702 being the highest ever since the introduction of the home and away system in 1974.

The Burrow Appreciation Award

Men's

Women's

References

External links

Rugby football culture
Rugby league organisations
South Sydney Rabbitohs
Sports fandom
Supporters' trusts